The Ho-Am Prize in Medicine was established in 1990 by Kun-Hee Lee, the Chairman of Samsung, to honour the late Chairman, Lee Byung-chul, the founder of the company. The Ho-Am Prize in Medicine is one of six prizes awarded annually, covering the five categories of Science, Engineering, Medicine, Arts, and Community Service, plus a Special Prize, which are named after the late Chairman's sobriquet (art-name or pen name), Ho-Am.

The Ho-Am Prize in Medicine is presented each year, together with the other prizes, to individuals of Korean heritage who have furthered the welfare of humanity through distinguished accomplishments in the field of Medicine.

Prizewinners of Ho-Am Prize for Medicine
Source: Ho-Am Foundation

See also
 Ho-Am Prize in Science
 Ho-Am Prize in the Arts
 Ho-Am Prize in Engineering
 Ho-Am Prize in Community Service
 Asan Award in Medicine
 List of medicine awards

References

External links 
 Previous Laureates
 This Year Laureates

Medicine awards
Healthcare in South Korea
Awards established in 1991
South Korean awards
Samsung
Annual events in South Korea
1991 establishments in South Korea